Tybroughton, occasionally written Ty Broughton, is the name of a former civil parish, historically in the Maelor Saesneg area of Flintshire, Wales and now in Wrexham County Borough. The rather isolated rural area contains no nucleated villages, although there are a few small hamlets such as Eglwys Cross.

The name is still used for an electoral ward of the community of Bronington.

History

Tybroughton was anciently a township (an administrative subdivision) of the parish of Hanmer: D. R. Thomas speculated that it was identifiable with the lost manor of 'Burwardestone' mentioned in the Domesday Book. The Wrexham historian Alfred Neobard Palmer said that the Welsh language place name Tybroughton was recorded as early as 1405 "and can only mean 'Broughton's House' ". Tybroughton was also recorded in 1699 by the antiquary Edward Lhuyd, who pointed out an "artificial mount" there called 'Mount Cop' or Eglwys y Groes, probably a motte.

In the mid 18th century,
Thomas Pennant stayed at a house in the area, writing: "I took my quarters at Broughton [...] a venerable wooden house in possession of my respected kinsman Peter Davies, Esq, in right of his lady, eldest surviving sister of the late Broughton Whitehall".

Writing in 1840 the topographer Samuel Lewis said the township had a population of 218. It was defined as a separate civil parish by the Local Government Act 1894, but was one of the civil parishes incorporated into the community of Bronington, part of the new county of Clwyd, under the terms of the Local Government Act 1972.

Buildings

Tybroughton Hall is a grade II listed house of the late 18th century.

References

Populated places in Wrexham County Borough